Northwestern High School was a public high school located in Baltimore, Maryland, from 1965 to 2017. When It was built in 1965, it was racially integrated.

When plans were announced in 2016 to close the school, alumni and community leaders mounted an ultimately unsuccessful campaign to keep it open.  Northwestern High School closed at the end of the 2016–2017 school year, having been merged with Forest Park High School as part of the city school district's "21st Century Schools Building Plan" to consolidate and modernize its schools in response to declining enrollments. Student records are obtainable through BCPS school headquarters.

Notable alumni
 Frank M. Conaway, Jr., Member, Maryland House of Delegates
 Sheila Dixon, Mayor, Baltimore City (2007-2010)
 Mark A. R. Kleiman, an American professor, author, and blogger who dealt with issues of drug and criminal justice policy.
 John Clark Mayden, photographer
 Ray Snell, University of Wisconsin, NFL's Tampa Bay Buccaneers
 Sean Vanhorse, defensive back, Miami Dolphins, Detroit Lions, San Diego Chargers, Minnesota Vikings 
 Terrance West, Baltimore Ravens running back

References

External links
 Northwestern High School - Maryland Report Card

Defunct schools in Maryland